Gympie State High School is a coeducational public secondary school located in Gympie in the Wide Bay–Burnett region in Queensland, Australia. The school has a total enrolment of more than 900 students per year, with an official count of 922 students in August 2020.

Gympie State High School retains its original motto, Ecollegio Metallisque Aurum, meaning "Gold from the school as well as the mines", and its official colours of maroon and gold.

History

Gympie State High School opened in January 1912 as the first secondary school in Queensland. The school was originally located on Lawrence Street, where Gympie Central State School is now located. The first building on Cootharaba Road was constructed in 1917 and became one of Gympie's most iconic buildings. On 18 May 1955, the original building was destroyed by fire as a result of a science experiment. Later that year, Blocks B, C and D were built on the same site. Blocks E, J and M were later built in the 1960s, whereas Blocks A, H and Hamilton Hall were constructed during the 1970s, followed by the construction of Blocks N, O and the school pool during the 1980s. In the 1990s, K Block was reconstructed from a 1930s building and the present administration building was constructed. The last major development at Gympie State High School occurred in 2014 in preparation for the introduction of Year 7 to the school.

On 21 September 2018, some of the buildings at Gympie State High School were entered into the Queensland Heritage Register.

Curriculum

Excellence programs

Excellence programs available to students at Gympie State High School include:

 Gympie Music School of Excellence
 On-line College of Coding
 Rural Industries School of Excellence (RISE) program
 Scholarship Program
 Specialised School of Excellence - Mathematics & Science
 Sport Academy (Rugby League, Futsal and Volleyball)

Learning Enhancement Program

The Learning Enhancement Program aims to engage Year 8 students in a variety of innovative high-interest programs. Students may choose from one of
Gympie State High School's Excellence Programs or rotate through the four 10-week courses Dance/Drama, Essential Business, Hospitality and Visual Art.

English

English is a compulsory core subject across the Year 7–10 curriculum. In Year 10, each student undertakes one of the subjects of General English, Essential English and Literature. English subjects available to students in Years 11 and 12 include the General subjects of English and Literature, and the Applied subject of Essential English.

Mathematics

Mathematics is a compulsory core subject across the Year 7–10 curriculum. In Year 10, each student undertakes one of the subjects of General Mathematics, Essential Mathematics and Mathematical Methods. Mathematics subjects available to students in Years 11 and 12 include the General subjects of General Mathematics, Mathematical Methods and Specialist Mathematics, and the Applied subject of Essential Mathematics.

Humanities

The Humanities subjects of History and Geography are studied as compulsory core subjects across the Year 7–9 curriculum. In Year 9, the semester-long elective subject of Business Essentials becomes available. Year 10 Humanities subjects include Business Essentials, Citizenship Education – Civics & Law, Geography, History and Japanese. Humanities subjects available to students in Years 11 and 12 include the General subjects of Accounting, Ancient History, Business, Geography, Legal Studies and Modern History, and the short course of Career Education.

Science

Science is a compulsory core subject across the Year 7–9 curriculum. Year 10 science subjects include Agricultural Practices, Aquatic Practices and Rural Operations, and the Preparatory Science subjects of Agriculture, Biology, Chemistry and Physics. Science subjects available to students in Years 11 and 12 include the General subjects of Agricultural Science, Biology, Chemistry and Physics, and the Applied subjects of Agricultural Practices, Aquatic Practices and Science in Practice.

Health & Physical Education

Health & Physical Education is a compulsory core subject across the Year 7–9 curriculum. Year 10 Health & Physical Education subjects include Physical Education and Sport & Recreation. Health & Physical Education subjects available to students in Years 11 and 12 include the General subject of Physical Education and the Applied subject of Sport & Recreation.

Languages

Japanese is studied as a compulsory core subject in Years 7 and 8, and from Year 9, it is studied as an elective subject.

The Arts

The Arts subject of Visual art is studied as a rotational subject for one term in Year 7 and Music is studied as a rotational subject for one term in Year 8. Arts subjects available to students in Years 9 and 10 include Drama, Music and Visual Art, whereas Visual Arts in Practice is available to students in Year 10 only. Arts subjects available to students in Years 11 and 12 include the General subjects of Drama, Music, Music Extension (Musicology), Music Extension (Performance), Visual Art and Film, Television & New Media, and the Applied subjects of Drama in Practice, Music in Practice and Visual Arts in Practice.

Technologies

Home Economics

Home Economics is studied as a rotational subject for one term in Year 8. Year 9 Home Economics subjects include the semester-long subjects of Food Technology and Textile Technology, whereas Year 10 Home Economics subjects include Food – Cooking & Hospitality, Food Studies & Nutrition and Textile Studies & Early Childhood. Home Economics subjects available to students in Years 11 and 12 include the General subject of Food & Nutrition and the Applied subjects of Early Childhood Studies and Hospitality Practices.

Industrial Technology & Design

Industrial Technology & Design is studied as a rotational subject for one term in Year 8. Years 9 and 10 Industrial Technology & Design subjects include Industrial Technology A, Industrial Technology B and Graphics. Industrial Technology & Design subjects available to students in Years 11 and 12 include the General subject of Design and the Applied subjects of Industrial Graphics Skills and Industrial Technology Skills.

Information Technology

The Information Technology subject of Digital Technology is studied as a rotational subject for one term in Years 7 and 8, whereas the Information Technology subject of Science, Technology, Engineering & Mathematics (STEM) is studied as a rotational subject for one term in Year 7 only. In Year 9, Digital Technology is studied as a semester-long elective subject, whereas both the subjects of Digital Technology and STEM are studied as year-long electives in Year 10. The Applied subject of Information & Communication Technology is available to students in Years 11 and 12.

Support services

Learning Partnerships Program

The Learning Partnerships Program is an educational program that aims to support students with a disability to develop socially and emotionally in order to become independent thinkers, communicators and problem solvers. Years 10–12 Learning Partnerships Program subjects include Practical English, Practical Mathematics and Workplace Practices (Year 12 only), and the Alternate Learning Program subjects of the ASDAN program, Café and Horticulture.

Ka'bi Place

The Ka'bi Place Indigenous Support Team aims to establish and maintain good working relationships with students, parents, carers and the community.

Programs operated by the Ka'bi Place Indigenous Support Team include:

 Crossing Cultures Programs
 Cultural Camp
 Deadly Young Persons Program
 Ka'bi Homework Club
 Murri Futures
 Youth Employment Program

Vocational Education & Training

Vocational Education & Training (VET) courses available to Year 10 students include:

 Certificate I in Business (BSB10115)
 Certificate I in Construction (CPC10111)
 Certificate I in Information, Digital Media & Technology (ICT10115)
 Certificate II in Creative Industries (CUA20215)

VET courses available to students in Years 11 and 12 include:

 Certificate I in Furnishing (MSF10113)
 Certificate I in Hospitality (SIT10216)
 Certificate I in Information, Digital Media & Technology (ICT10115)
 Certificate I in Manufacturing (Pathways) (MSM10216)
 Certificate II in Business (BSB20115)
 Certificate II in Engineering Pathways (MEM20413)
 Certificate II in Furnishing Pathways (MSF20313)
 Certificate II in Hospitality (SIT20316)
 Certificate II in Information, Digital Media & Technology (ICT20115)
 Certificate II in Rural Operations (AHC21216)
 Certificate III in Fitness (SIS30315)
 Certificate IV in Digital & Interactive Games (ICT40915)

References

External links

 

 Gympie State High School Discover Queensland Buildings website

Public high schools in Queensland
Gympie
Schools in Wide Bay–Burnett
Educational institutions established in 1912
1912 establishments in Australia
Queensland Heritage Register